The 2012 VCU Rams baseball team will represent Virginia Commonwealth University in the 2012 NCAA Division I baseball season. The Rams play their home games at The Diamond northwest of downtown Richmond, Virginia.

Personnel

2012 roster 

2012 VCU Rams Baseball Roster

Coaching staff

Schedule 

! style="background:#000;color:#f8b800;"| Regular Season
|- valign="top" 

|-  style="text-align:center; background:#bfb;"
| 1 || February 17 || @  || Blair Field || 5-4 || Alford (1-0)  || Magallon (0-1) || Hauser (1) ||  1,200 || 1–0 || –
|-  style="text-align:center; background:#fbb;"
| 2 || February 18 || @ Long Beach State || Blair Field || 6-7 || Frye (1-0) || Lees (0-1) || — || 899 || 1–1 || –
|-  style="text-align:center; background:#fbb;"
| 3 || February 19 || @ Long Beach State || Blair Field || 2-3 || Strufing (1-0) || Pelchy (0-1) || Hunt (1) || 862 || 1–2 || –
|-  style="text-align:center; background:#fbb;"
| 4 || February 21 || @  || Eddy D. Field Stadium || 1-6 || Miller (1-0) || Cutler-Voltz (0-1) || — || 156 || 1–3 || –
|-  style="text-align:center; background:#fbb;"
| 5 || February 22 || @ Pepperdine || Eddy D. Field Stadium || 2-11 || Maurer (1-0) || Morrison (0-1) || — || 161 || 1–4 || –
|-  style="text-align:center; background:#bfb;"
| 6 || February 24 ||   || The Diamond || 5-1 || Haynes (1-0) || Augliera (0-1) || – || 185 || 2–4 || –
|-  style="text-align:center; background:#bfb;"
| 7 || February 25 || Binghamton || The Diamond || 5-1 || Farrar (1-0) || Lynch (0-1) || Hauser (2) || 294 || 3–4 || –
|-  style="text-align:center; background:#bfb;"
| 8 || February 26 || Binghamton || The Diamond || 12-3 || Pelchy (1-1) || Lambert (0-1) || — || 307 || 4–4 || –
|-  style="text-align:center; background:#bfb;"
| 9 || February 28 || Norfolk State || The Diamond || 4-3 || Cutler-Voltz (1-1) || Vanassche (0-2) || Hauser (3) || 173 || 5–4 || –
|-

|-  style="text-align:center; background:#fbb;"
| 10 || March 2 || Monmouth || The Diamond || 4-6 || Light (2-1) || Haynes (1-1) || McGee (1) || 231 || 5–5 || –
|-  style="text-align:center; background:#bfb;"
| 11 || March 3 || Monmouth || The Diamond || 8-0 || Farrar (2-0) || Smith (1-2) || — || || 6–5 || –
|-  style="text-align:center; background:#bfb;"
| 12 || March 4 || Monmouth || The Diamond || 5-3 || Pelchy (2-1) || Frey (1-1) || Hauser (4) || 214  || 7–5 || –
|-  style="text-align:center; background:#bfb;"
| 13 || March 6 || Temple || The Diamond || 6-3 ||   ||   ||   ||  || 8–5 || –
|-  style="text-align:center; background:#bfb;"
| 14 || March 9 || Towson || The Diamond || 6-3 ||   ||   ||   ||  || 9–5 || 1–0
|-  style="text-align:center; background:#fbb;"
| 15 || March 10 || Towson || The Diamond || 2-3 ||   ||   ||   ||  || 9–6 || 1–1
|-  style="text-align:center; background:#bfb;"
| 16 || March 11 || Towson || The Diamond || 9-8 ||   ||   ||   ||  || 10–6 || 2–1
|-  style="text-align:center; background:#bfb;"
| 17 || March 13 || @ #25 East Carolina || Clark-LeClair Stadium || 18-11 ||   ||   ||   ||  || 11–6 || 2–1
|-  style="text-align:center; background:#fbb;"
| 18 || March 16 || @ Hofstra || University Field  || 4-7 ||   ||   ||   ||  || 11–7 || 2–2
|-  style="text-align:center; background:#fbb;"
| 19 || March 17 || @ Hofstra || University Field || 4-13 ||   ||   ||   ||  || 11–8|| 2–3
|-  style="text-align:center; background:#fbb;"
| 20 || March 18 || @ Hofstra || University Field || 5-12 ||   ||   ||   ||  || 11–9 || 2–4
|-  style="text-align:center; background:#fbb;"
| 21 || March 21 || @ Richmond || Malcolm U. Pitt Field || 1-7 ||   ||   ||   ||  || 11–10 || 2–4
|-  style="text-align:center; background:#fbb;"
| 22 || March 23 ||  || The Diamond || 6-9 ||   ||   ||   ||  || 11–11 || 2–5
|-  style="text-align:center; background:#bfb;"
| 23 || March 24 || UNC Wilmington || The Diamond || 5-4 ||   ||   ||   ||  || 12–11 || 3–5
|-  style="text-align:center; background:#fbb;"
| 24 || March 25 || UNC Wilmington || The Diamond || 0-4 ||   ||   ||   ||  || 12–12 || 3–6
|-  style="text-align:center; background:#bfb;"
| 25 || March 27 || @  || Al Worthington Stadium || 4-2 ||   ||   ||   ||  || 13–12 || 3–6
|-  style="text-align:center; background:#bfb;"
| 26 || March 30 || @ Northeastern || Parsons Field || 6-2 ||   ||   ||   ||  || 14–12 || 4–6
|-  style="text-align:center; background:#bfb;"
| 27 || March 31 || @ Northeastern || Parsons Field || 8-2 ||   ||   ||   ||  || 15–12 || 5–6
|-

|-  style="text-align:center; background:#bfb;"
| 28 || April 1 || @ Northeastern || Parsons Field || 10-3 ||   ||   ||   ||  || 16–12 || 6–6
|-  style="text-align:center; background:#bfb;"
| 29 || April 4 || Liberty || The Diamond || 5-4 ||   ||   ||   ||  || 17–12 || –
|-  style="text-align:center; background:#fbb;"
| 30 || April 6 ||  || The Diamond || 4-7 ||   ||   ||   ||  || 17–13 || 6–7
|-  style="text-align:center; background:#fbb;"
| 31 || April 7 || George Mason || The Diamond || 0-2 ||   ||   ||   ||  || 17–14 || 6–8
|-  style="text-align:center; background:#fbb;"
| 32 || April 8 || George Mason || The Diamond || 2-4 ||   ||   ||   ||  || 17–15 || 6–9
|-  style="text-align:center; background:#bfb;"
| 33 || April 10 || VMI || The Diamond || 18-1 ||   ||   ||   ||  || 18–15 || –
|-  style="text-align:center; background:#fbb;"
| 34 || April 13 || @ Delaware || Bob Hannah Stadium || 1-10 ||   ||   ||   ||  || 18–16 || 6–9
|-  style="text-align:center; background:#bfb;"
| 35 || April 14 || @ Delaware || Bob Hannah Stadium || 11-4 ||   ||   ||   ||  || 19–16 || 7–10
|-  style="text-align:center; background:#fbb;"
| 36 || April 15 || @ Delaware || Bob Hannah Stadium || 2-6 ||   ||   ||   ||  || 19–17 || 7–11
|-  style="text-align:center; background:#bfb;"
| 37 || April 17 ||  || Bolding Stadium || 9-0 ||   ||   ||   ||  || 20–17 || –
|-  style="text-align:center; background:#fbb;"
| 38 || April 20 || William & Mary || The Diamond || 3-4 ||   ||   ||   ||  || 20–18 || 7–12
|-  style="text-align:center; background:#bfb;"
| 39 || April 21 || William & Mary || The Diamond || 7-4 ||   ||   ||   ||  || 21–18 || 8–12
|-  style="text-align:center; background:#bfb;"
| 40 || April 22 || William & Mary || The Diamond || 5-4 ||   ||   ||   ||  || 22–18 || 9–12
|-  style="text-align:center; background:#fbb;"
| 41 || April 27 || @ Old Dominion || Bud Metheny Baseball Complex || 1-4 ||   ||   ||   ||  || 22–19 || 9–13
|-  style="text-align:center; background:#bfb;"
| 42 || April 28 || @ Old Dominion || Bud Metheny Baseball Complex || 7-6 ||   ||   ||   ||  || 23–19 || 10–13
|-  style="text-align:center; background:#bfb;"
| 43 || April 29 || @ Old Dominion || Bud Metheny Baseball Complex || 3-0 ||   ||   ||   ||  || 24–19 || 11–13
|-

|-  style="text-align:center; background:#bfb;"
| 44 || May 1 || @ VMI || Gray–Minor Stadium || 6–3 ||   ||   ||   ||  || 25–19 || –
|-  style="text-align:center; background:#bfb;"
| 45 || May 4 || Georgia State || The Diamond || 4–3 ||   ||   ||   ||  || 26–19 || 12–13
|-  style="text-align:center; background:#fbb;"
| 46 || May 5 || Georgia State || The Diamond || 3–12 ||   ||   ||   ||  || 26–20 || 12–14
|-  style="text-align:center; background:#bfb;"
| 47 || May 6 || Georgia State || The Diamond || 6–4 ||   ||   ||   ||  || 27–20 || 13–14
|-  style="text-align:center; background:#bfb;"
| 48 || May 8 || Richmond || The Diamond || 6–4 ||   ||   ||   ||  || 28–20 || –
|-  style="text-align:center; background:#fbb;"
| 49 || May 11 || @  || Veterans Memorial Park || 11–13 ||   ||   ||   ||  || 28–21 || 13–15
|-  style="text-align:center; background:#bfb;"
| 50 || May 12 || @ James Madison || Veterans Memorial Park || 9–3 ||   ||   ||   ||  || 29–21 || 14–15
|-  style="text-align:center; background:#bfb;"
| 51 || May 13 || @ James Madison || Veterans Memorial Park || 10–8 ||   ||   ||   ||  || 30–21 || 15–15
|-  style="text-align:center; background:#fbb;"
| 52 || May 15 || @ Virginia || Davenport Field || 5–7 ||   ||   ||   ||  || 30–22 || –
|-  style="text-align:center; background:#bfb;"
| 53 || May 17 || @ VMI || Gray–Minor Stadium || 7–2 ||   ||   ||   ||  || 31–22 || –
|-  style="text-align:center; background:#bfb;"
| 54 || May 18 || VMI || The Diamond || 6–7 ||   ||   ||   ||  || 31–23 || –
|-  style="text-align:center; background:#bfb;"
| 55 || May 19 || East Carolina || The Diamond || 11–2 ||   ||   ||   ||  || 32–23 || –
|-

|-  style="text-align:center; background:#bfb;"
| 56 || May 23 ||  vs. George Mason || Veterans Memorial Park || 11–7  ||  ||  ||  ||  || 33–23 || –
|-  style="text-align:center; background:#fbb;"
| 57 || May 24 ||  vs. UNC Wilmington || Veterans Memorial Park || 5–8 ||  ||  ||  ||  || 33–24 || –
|-  style="text-align:center; background:#bfb;"
| 58 || May 25 ||  vs. Towson || Veterans Memorial Park || 14–9  ||  ||  ||  ||  || 34–24 || –
|-  style="text-align:center; background:#fbb;"
| 59 || May 26 ||  vs. Hofstra || Veterans Memorial Park || 2–4 ||  ||  ||  ||  || 34–25 || –
|-

|-
|

Rankings

Awards and honors

References 

Virginia Commonwealth Rams Baseball Team, 2012
VCU Rams baseball seasons
VCU Rams